The Timmins City Council is the governing body for the city of Timmins, Ontario, Canada.  the council consists of the mayor and eight councillors from five wards. Four councillors represent Ward 5, while the other wards are represented by a single councillor each.

Council members

2018–2022
George Pirie, mayor (until 2 June 2022)
Kristin Murray, acting mayor (from August 2022)
Rock Whissell, Ward 1 Councillor
Mickey Auger, Ward 2 Councillor
Joe Campbell, Ward 3 Councillor
John P. Curley, Ward 4 Councillor
Andrew Marks, Ward 5 Councillor
Kristin Murray, Ward 5 Councillor
Noella Rinaldo, Ward 5 Councillor
Michelle Boileau, Ward 5 Councillor

2022–2026
Michelle Boileau, mayor
Rock Whissell, Ward 1 Councillor
Lorne Feldman, Ward 2 Councillor
Bill Gvozdanovic, Ward 3 Councillor
John P. Curley, Ward 4 Councillor
Steve Black, Ward 5 Councillor
Andrew Marks, Ward 5 Councillor
Kristin Murray, Ward 5 Councillor
Cory Robin, Ward 5 Councillor

See also 
List of mayors of Timmins

References

External links 
 Timmins City Council

Municipal councils in Ontario
Municipal government of Timmins